Roger Albertsen (15 March 1957 – 2 March 2003) was a Norwegian football midfielder.

Club career
At the age of 17 he travelled abroad, playing professionally for Dutch team FC Den Haag. He later played for Feyenoord Rotterdam, KFC Winterslag and Olympiakos, before he returned to Norway in 1985, making his debut in the Norwegian Premier League for Rosenborg.

Netherlands
Albertsen began his career with local lower-division sides Tyssedal and Odda. He was regarded as a promising talent, and represented Norway several times at youth level. Nonetheless, it came as something of a shock when he left the country at age 17 to try his luck in the Netherlands, joining his compatriot Harald Berg's old club Den Haag. Albertsen made his debut for the club in 1975, and soon became a regular in the Den Haag lineup, earning praise for his tireless running and no–nonsense physical play. His performance in the Eredivisie at Den Haag didn't go unnoticed back home and he made his debut for Norway in 1976.

In the summer of 1979, Albertsen was transferred to Feyenoord, where he became a valuable player in the side that finished fourth in the league and won the cup. However, at the end of the season, after just one year in Rotterdam, he returned to Den Haag.

Winterslag
He played one more season for Den Haag, and then he was on the move again – this time to Belgian side Winterslag (now known as Racing Genk following a 1988 merger). Albertsen quickly became a fan favorite at the Belgian club, and his performances earned him a recall to the national team for the World Cup qualifier against England – the game that would provide Albertsen's finest moment in a Norway shirt.

Olympiacos
Midway through the 1982/83 season, Albertsen was signed by Greek giants Olympiacos, where he won a league championship medal. He spent three years at the club, doing the dirty work in midfield, before his old friend Arne Dokken persuaded him to return home and play for Rosenborg

Rosenborg
So, in the summer of 1985, after a decade abroad, Albertsen played his first-ever top division game in the Norwegian league. He was a member of the Rosenborg side that won the title in dramatic fashion in 1985, and played two more years at the Trondheim club before retiring because of injury at the end of the 1987 season.

International career
He was capped 25 times for Norway, having debuted in 1976. Many remember him from the famous match against England in 1981, where he was awarded the 1–1 goal, despite that television replays have later shown that Albertsen did in fact not touch the ball, and Tom Lund's cross went straight into the net.

He made his international debut in a World Cup qualifier against Switzerland in 1976. He is credited with scoring the equaliser in Norway's win over England in 1981. Bryan Robson gave the visitors the lead after 15 minutes. In the 35th minute, Albertsen went after a cross from Tom Lund and the ball went into the net. Albertsen was credited with the goal, but television replays seem to indicate that Albertsen did not make contact with the ball before it crossed the line. Hallvar Thoresen scored Norway's second goal four minutes before half-time and Norway went on to win the game 2–1.

Albertsen now got an extended run in the national side, and scored two more goals in a pair of summer friendlies. This time there was no doubt about Albertsen being the scorer. He was also a member of the team that defeated Yugoslavia 3–1 in a Euro 84 qualifier. Shortly after that match, he was on the move again.

Roger Albertsen was a hard-working and hard-tackling midfielder who never truly established himself as a first-choice in the Norway lineup, but he was a dependable player who did a fine job whenever he got the chance. He wasn't a finesse player, but his work-rate and determination made him a fan favorite at every club he played.

Retirement and death
After retiring from the game, Albertsen worked in the computer business, and also held coaching jobs for lower-division sides Orkanger, Sokna and Kongsberg. In late 2002, he was diagnosed with cancer, and he died from the disease in March 2003.

Honours

Club
Feyenoord
KNVB Cup: 1979–80

Olympiacos F.C.
Super League Greece: 1982–83

Rosenborg BK
Norwegian Premier League Championship: 1985

Individual
Norwegian Football Association Gold Watch

References

External links
 
 Career bio, Bergens Tidende
 

1957 births
2003 deaths
Association football midfielders
Norwegian footballers
Norwegian football managers
Norway international footballers
ADO Den Haag players
Feyenoord players
K.F.C. Winterslag players
Olympiacos F.C. players
Rosenborg BK players
Eliteserien players
Belgian Pro League players
Eredivisie players
People from Odda
Deaths from cancer in Norway
Norwegian expatriate footballers
Norwegian expatriate sportspeople in the Netherlands
Expatriate footballers in the Netherlands
Norwegian expatriate sportspeople in Belgium
Expatriate footballers in Belgium
Norwegian expatriate sportspeople in Greece
Expatriate footballers in Greece
Orkanger IF managers
Kongsberg IF managers
Sportspeople from Vestland